Guanciale is an Italian cured meat product prepared from pork jowl or cheeks. Its name is derived from guancia, the Italian word for 'cheek'.

Production
Pork cheek is rubbed with salt and spices (typically ground black or red pepper, thyme or fennel, and sometimes garlic) and cured for three weeks or until it loses approximately 30% of its original weight. Its flavour is stronger than other pork products, such as pancetta, and its texture is more delicate.  Upon cooking, the fat typically melts away.

In cuisine
Guanciale may be cut and eaten directly in small portions, but is often used as an ingredient in pasta dishes such as spaghetti alla carbonara and sauces like sugo all'amatriciana.

It is a specialty of central Italy, particularly Umbria and Lazio. Pancetta, a cured Italian bacon which is normally not smoked, is sometimes used as a substitute when guanciale is not available.

References

External links

Bacon dishes
Cuts of pork
Salumi